Eva Břízová (born 15 May 1942) is a Czech former cross-country skier. She competed in three events at the 1964 Winter Olympics.

Cross-country skiing results

Olympic Games

References

External links
 

1942 births
Living people
Czech female cross-country skiers
Olympic cross-country skiers of Czechoslovakia
Cross-country skiers at the 1964 Winter Olympics
People from Ústí nad Orlicí District
Sportspeople from the Pardubice Region